Sprites Ward is a ward in the South West Area of Ipswich, Suffolk, England. It returns three councillors to Ipswich Borough Council.

It is designated Middle Layer Super Output Area Ipswich 013 by the Office of National Statistics. It is composed of 5 Lower Layer Super Output Areas.

References

Wards of Ipswich